Saint David is one of Dominica's ten administrative parishes, located on the eastern side of the island. It is bordered by St. Andrew to the north; St. Joseph, St. Paul and St. George to the west; and St. Patrick to the south. It has an area of 131.6 km² (50.8 mi²), and has a population of 6,789.

Settlements
Its largest settlement is Castle Bruce, with a population of 1,653. It includes the Indigenous community of the *Carib Territory. (Kalinago Territory) which has a population of about 3000 spread across 7 hamlets. Other villages include:
Grand Fond
Rosalie
Good Hope
Petit Soufrière
Riviere Cyrique
Morne Jaune
San Sauveur
Carib Territory
Atkinson
Antrizle

Areas of interest
The northern area of the parish is also home to the island's Carib Territory, in and around which 3,000 pure, indigenous Caribs live.

References

 
Parishes of Dominica